Jericho Creek is a tributary of Plum Island River, Essex County, Massachusetts.

References

Rivers of Essex County, Massachusetts
Rivers of Massachusetts
Newbury, Massachusetts